Michael "Monkey" Boisvert (born 1973) is a Canadian actor and choreographer.

Boisvert studied business at college, but left to become a model. He later turned to acting, moving to New York City and then California to pursue work opportunities. He is a graduate of the American Musical and Dramatic Academy.

Boisvert has appeared in film and television and is most notable for his lead roles in Celeste in the City, Deadly Skies and the television series Young Blades.

Personal life
He has been married to Jennifer Kuipers since 19 May 2005 and he has a daughter.

Filmography

References

External links

Michael Boisvert Demo Reel

1973 births
Living people
Canadian male television actors
Canadian male film actors
Canadian choreographers
People from Timmins
Franco-Ontarian people
Male actors from Ontario
American Musical and Dramatic Academy alumni